The Visa-Bikar 2003 was the forty-fourth season of the Icelandic national football cup. It started on May 18, 2003 and concluded with the final on September 27, 2003. The winners qualified for the first qualifying round of the UEFA Cup 2004–05.

Preliminary round

First round

Second round

Third round

Fourth round

Quarterfinals

Semifinals

Final

External links
 RSSSF Page

2003 domestic association football cups
2003 in Icelandic football
2003